Zou Kai (born February 25, 1988, in Luzhou, Sichuan) is a five-time Olympic and five-time World champion Chinese gymnast, specializing in floor exercise and the horizontal bar.

Zou won his first three Olympic gold medals at the 2008 Olympic Games in Beijing, resulting in a nomination for the Laureus World Sports Award for Breakthrough of the Year in 2009. He later won two additional gold medals at the 2012 Olympic Games in London.

With a total of five gold medals and one bronze, Zou currently holds the record for most Olympic gold medals won by any Chinese athlete in Olympic history, and is tied for the record of most medals won overall.

Competitive career

World Championships debut
Zou made his debut at the 2006 World Artistic Gymnastics Championships in Aarhus, helping the Chinese Team win gold, and placing sixth at the individual floor exercise final.

At the 2007 World Artistic Gymnastics Championships in Stuttgart, Zou achieved the same results, winning the team competition and again placing sixth on floor.

2006 Asian Games
Zou participated in the 2006 Asian Games in Doha, winning gold in the floor exercise and silver in the horizontal bar individual events, as well as a gold medal as part of the Chinese team.

2008 Summer Olympics

On his Olympic debut at the 2008 Summer Olympics in Beijing, Zou contributed to the team's gold and also won unexpected individual gold medals on floor exercise and the horizontal bar scoring 16.050 and 16.200 respectively.

Zou was the second Chinese Olympian to receive three gold medals at a single Olympic Games, following Li Ning who first achieved the feat at the 1984 Summer Olympics, and was the most successful Chinese athlete at the Beijing Olympics, with the most gold medal wins.

2009 World Championships
During the 2009 World Artistic Gymnastics Championships in London, Zou won a gold medal in the individual horizontal bar event and also won a silver medal at the floor exercise individual event.

2011 World Championships
After being left out of the Chinese Gymnastic Team at both the 2010 World Championships in Rotterdam and 2010 Asian Games in Guangzhou due to weaknesses in the apparatuses he did not specialize in, Zou again won two gold and one silver medals at the 2011 World Artistic Gymnastics Championships in Tokyo, matching his feat back in 2009.

2012 Summer Olympics

At the 2012 Summer Olympics in London, Zou led the team to win gold and later successfully defended his Olympic title at the floor exercise, winning gold again, only the second to do so in the men's floor exercise following Soviet Gymnast Nikolai Andrianov who won the event in 1972 and 1976. He was unable to defend his title in the horizontal bar however, finishing less than two tenths of a point behind the lead, eventually winning a bronze medal in the event. The last gymnast to successfully defend his Olympic title on the high bar was Mitsuo Tsukahara, who won the event in 1972 and 1976, at the same Olympics as Andrianov.

With a total of five Olympic gold medals, Zou holds the record for most golds won by any Chinese athlete in Olympic history, and by adding a bronze medal to the tally, he tied the record for most medals overall, with six.

2014 Asian Games
Zou participated in the 2014 Asian Games in Incheon, winning gold in both the floor exercise and horizontal bar individual events, as well as a bronze medal as part of the Chinese team.

Charitable work
Zou, a Sichuan native, auctioned off one of his Olympic gold medals in 2008, donating all proceeds to fund relief efforts in the aftermath of the 2008 Sichuan earthquake. Out of the three gold medals he'd earned at the 2008 Summer Olympics in Beijing, he chose the medal won for his floor exercise routine for its special significance since only two other Chinese gymnasts had ever won it, Li Ning and Li Xiaoshuang.

See also

 China at the 2008 Summer Olympics
 China at the 2012 Summer Olympics
 List of Olympic medalists in gymnastics (men)
 List of multiple Olympic gold medalists
 List of multiple Olympic gold medalists at a single Games

References

External links

 
 

1988 births
Living people
Chinese male artistic gymnasts
Gymnasts at the 2008 Summer Olympics
Gymnasts at the 2012 Summer Olympics
Medalists at the World Artistic Gymnastics Championships
Olympic gold medalists for China
Olympic gymnasts of China
People from Luzhou
Olympic medalists in gymnastics
Olympic bronze medalists for China
Gymnasts from Sichuan
Chinese philanthropists
Medalists at the 2012 Summer Olympics
Medalists at the 2008 Summer Olympics
Asian Games medalists in gymnastics
Gymnasts at the 2006 Asian Games
Gymnasts at the 2014 Asian Games
Asian Games gold medalists for China
Asian Games silver medalists for China
Asian Games bronze medalists for China
Medalists at the 2006 Asian Games
Medalists at the 2014 Asian Games